Maxim Kosarev (born 20 July 1969 in Moscow) is a Russian trap shooter. He competed in the trap event at the 2012 Summer Olympics and placed 9th in the qualification round.

References

1969 births
Living people
Russian male sport shooters
Olympic shooters of Russia
Shooters at the 2012 Summer Olympics
Sportspeople from Moscow